This was the first ever Commonwealth tournament held, Anastasia Rodionova and Sally Peers of Australia were the top seed. They won the gold medal after defeating fellow Australians Olivia Rogowska and Jessica Moore 6-3, 2-6, 6-3.

Medalists

Seeds

Main draw

Finals

Top half

Bottom half

References

Tennis at the 2010 Commonwealth Games
2010 in women's tennis